The Markbygden Wind Farm is a series of interconnected wind farms in the Markbygden area west of Piteå, Norrbotten county in northern Sweden. The project is expected to be completed by 2025 and might have a capacity of up to 4,000 megawatts (MW), comprising up to 1,101 wind turbines. The project was initially co-developed by Svevind AB and wind turbine manufacturer Enercon.
Combined the Markbygden Wind Farm is already the biggest wind farm in Europe, on track to be one of the biggest onshore windfarms in the world.

Layout
The project is divided into three larger phases plus two pilot projects, subdivided as follows:

History
The original plan was forged amongst Svevind and Enercon. If fully constructed, the 55 billion kronor (€5.1 billion, US$6.9 billion) project would be the largest onshore wind farm in Europe and one of the biggest in the world. The wind farm will cover some 450 square kilometers, comprising up to 1 101 wind turbines and is expected to produce up to 12 TWh/year of electricity. The project received the approval by the Norrbotten County authorities in April 2009.

Status as of October 2021

Phase 1
Phase 1 consists of three wind farms or projects; 101,1 MW Ersträsk, 644,4 MW Markbygden ETT, and 84,6 MW Skogberget,. Markbygden ETT was sold by Svevind to others. Ersträsk is developed by wind turbine manufacturer Enercon.

The first wind farm in Markbygden's phase 1 project was commissioned in 2014 and consists of 36 turbines, Enercon E-92 with 138m hub height. From December 2015, Svevind and Enercon set up a new structure. With that Enercon was taking over Svevind's shares of the operational Skogberget and Ersträsk wind farms.

Markbygden ETT ("ETT" means one in Swedish language) and is with its 179 wind turbines alone one of the largest single onshore wind farms in Europe.

All power generated by the entire Markbygden phase 1 wind farms is transferred via the Råbäcken transformer station to the Swedish 400kV national grid.

Phase 2
On December 10, 2015, the Environmental Court ruled on this second phase of the Markbygden project. The decision has gained legal force. This second phase will be connected to a new 400kV transformer station called Trolltjärn. The Markbygden phase 2 project is developed by Enercon since December 2015. The installed capacity may be as large as 844 MW.
As of October 2021 63 Enercon E-138 turbines with a total installed power of 252,7 MW are operational.

Credit Suisse acquired 85% of the 63-turbine northern project in 2020.

Plans for about 100 more turbines still exist.

Phase 3
Markbygden phase 3 is the third, last and potentially the largest part of the overall wind power project in Markbygden. It is located between the villages of Koler and Långträsk in the western part of the project and Blåsmark to the east, entirely within Piteå municipality. The wind farm of Markbygden phase 3 will consist of up to 442 wind turbines. The permit was granted on March 17, 2016. The decision of the Environmental impact assessment committee was appealed, after which the Land and Environmental Court announced a decision on the case on June 16, 2017. The decision of the Land and Environmental Court has thereafter been appealed to the Land and Environmental Superior Court, which approved it in 2018. The Markbygden phase 3 wind farms are planned to be connected to the existing 400kV transformer station Råbäcken as well the transformer station Trolltjärn.
The Önusberget 750 MW share of phase three was acquired by German asset manager Luxcara in April 2019, powered by 137 GE Cypress 5.5MW turbines for 25 years.

See also 

 Wind power in Sweden
 Renewable energy in Sweden

References

External links 

Proposed wind farms in Sweden